{{safesubst:#invoke:RfD|||month = March
|day = 17
|year = 2023
|time = 16:27
|timestamp = 20230317162711

|content=
REDIRECT Culture of Pakistan

}}